() or Falling in the Desert, is one of the eminent books by Iranian author Ali Shariati. The book is an extended article.

 literally means falling of man from heaven to earth.  exemplifies Shariati's style of writing. He tried to envisage the existential dimension of humans's spirit and soul.
The book has no introduction, formal conclusion, or body. It continuously digresses from one context to another without a normal style. The book begins with an account of the creation of man. Man is at the same time could be considered as Adam and Shariati. According to planned creation, the heaven has brought to earth and therefore there appeared an eternal peace and joy. Shariati describes a moving day by day account of the days of creation and specifically the story of the Covenant. Shariati interpretation of Satan’s disobedience is identical with mystical accounts in nature. He believes that it was lave that prevented Satan from bowing to anybody except his beloved. He used many digressions to through abnormal statements and phrases. Completely contrary to Hegel and his philosophy of history, Shariati believed that it is not true that the civilized human is less consciousness than now peoples but rather there is a difference between them. The civilized man could talk on himself more that universe and the new people are so concerned with reality and universe that there is no place for himself and mysticism and religion. Of course he knows the movement of soul in Hegel's philosophy and history in one sense as right.
He mentioned somebodies who are familiar and acquaintances with him during the history such as Ayn Al Qazat, Prometheus, Abul Ala Marri. He also considered with the art. he counted art as a shelter for himself. One other aspect of the book is that Shariati refers to his understanding of the degrees of religiosity of believers.

Quote:

See also
Kavir (book)

References

Books by Ali Shariati
Iranian books